Ntomba may be,

Lake Ntomba
Ntomba Twa
Ntomba language